Joachim Persson (born 2 December 1979) is a Swedish Bandy player who currently plays for Västerås SK as a defender.  Joachim was a youth product of IK Sirius.  Joachim made his first team debut for IK Sirius in the 1998/99 season.  

Joachim has played for two clubs:
 IK Sirius (1998-2004)
 Västerås SK (2004-)

External links
 

Swedish bandy players
Living people
1979 births
IK Sirius players
Västerås SK Bandy players
21st-century Swedish people